"Crucify My Love" is the fifteenth single by Japanese heavy metal band X Japan, released on August 26, 1996. A power ballad, "Crucify My Love" is written and performed entirely in English, unlike most of the band's songs.

Summary 
Its B-side is a live version of one of the band's earlier singles, "Week End", recorded on December 31, 1995 at the Tokyo Dome.

"Crucify My Love" was covered by Spanish gothic metal band Gothic Dolls on their 2008 album The Last Breath. It was the ending theme of the TV programme  on Asahi TV, and used in Nippon Oil's ZOA television advertisement.

Commercial performance 
The single reached number 2 on the Oricon charts, and charted for 9 weeks. It is certified Gold by RIAJ.

Track listing

Personnel 
Co-Producer – X Japan
Orchestra arranged by – Yoshiki, Dick Marx, Shelly Berg
Scored by – Tom Halm
Orchestra – American Symphony Orchestra
Mixed by – Mike Ging
Recorded by – Mike Ging, Rich Breen
Assistant engineers – Tal Miller, Carl Nappa, Paul Falcone
Mastered by – Stephen Marcussen
A&R directed by – Osamu Nagashima
Art directed by – Shige "#11" Komai
Executive producers – Ryuzo "Jr." Kosugi, Yukitaka Mashimo

References 

X Japan songs
Songs written by Yoshiki (musician)
English-language Japanese songs
Heavy metal ballads
1996 singles
1996 songs
Torch songs
1990s ballads